Statistics of Bahraini Premier League for the 1998–99 season.

Overview
It was contested by 10 teams, and Muharraq Club won the championship.

League standings

References
Bahrain – List of final tables (RSSSF)

Bahraini Premier League seasons
Bah
1998–99 in Bahraini football